Lee Todd may refer to:
Lee T. Todd, Jr. (born 1946), former president of the University of Kentucky
Lee Todd (footballer) (born 1972), English footballer
Lee Spencer-Todd, commonly known as Lee Spencer (born 1963), English electronic musician

See also